Tashi and Nungshi Malik (born 21 June 1991) are the first siblings and twins to climb the Seven Summits and reach the North and South Poles and complete the Adventurers Grand Slam and Three Poles Challenge.

Early life 

The Malik twins (Tashi and Nungshi) originally hail from Haryana state, India. They were born to an Indian Army officer, Col. Virendra Singh Malik, and his wife Anjoo Thapa in Anwali  Sonipat district of Haryana. Their family settled in Dehradun after Col Malik's retirement from the Indian army.

The girls attended several schools in the states of Madhya Pradesh, Uttar Pradesh, Uttarakhand, Tamil Nadu, Kerala and Manipur, including Lawrence School, Lovedale, near Ootacamund. In 2013 they completed graduation in Journalism and Mass communication from Sikkim Manipal University. They have a Certificate in Peace and Conflict Resolution from School of International Training in Vermont, United States. In 2015 the twin sisters graduated in Sport and Exercise from Southern Institute of Technology, Invercargill, New Zealand.

Mountaineering
The Malik sisters trained at the Nehru Institute of Mountaineering in 2010. On Sunday, 19 May 2013, they scaled Mount Everest, becoming the first twin sisters to do so. They were joined at the summit by Samina Baig and they placed the flags of India and Pakistan together to symbolise peace.

The twins participated in 'Climbathon 2013' where they scaled a virgin peak at 21000 ft funded by Indian Mountaineering Foundation in August 2013. They are also the first female twins to complete Seven Summits, complete the Explorers Grand Slam and the youngest people to complete the Three Pole Challenge. On 16 December 2014, after climbing Mount Vinson in Antarctica, they became world's first twins and siblings to scale the 'Seven Summits' together.

After scaling Mount Everest on 19 May 2013 they completed the Explorers Grand Slam on 15 July 2015 in just over two years. They are the first Indian and South Asians to complete the Explorers Grand Slam.
In Dec 2015, the twins scaled Aoraki (Mt Cook) New Zealand's tallest peak becoming first female twins to do so.
In September 2019, Nungshi and Tashi led Indian 'Khukuri Warriors' in the World's Toughest Race: Eco-Challenge Fiji that pitched 66 teams of adventure athletes from 30 nations against forces of nature and against each other traversing 671 km of rugged Fijian landscape, ocean, rivers, lakes and jungles using dozen adventure activities. They became the first and only South Asians to participate in this global adventure race.

Seven Summits climbing details

North pole and South pole

Honours and awards

 Awarded first New Zealand-India Sports Scholarship to study Graduation in Sport & Exercise at SIT, Invercargill, NZ
 Attended US Dept of State's 'Global Sports Mentoring Program' for emerging women leaders in sports in Sep-Oct 2015
 Conferred India's highest adventure honour 'Tenzing Norgay National Adventure Award' 2015 by the President of India on 29 August 2016
 In 2016 they were awarded the Leif Erikson Young Explorers Award in Iceland by president Guðni Th. Jóhannesson
They were awarded the Nari Shakti Puraskar in 2020.

See also
Indian summiters of Mount Everest - Year wise
List of Mount Everest summiters by number of times to the summit
List of Mount Everest records of India
List of Mount Everest records

References

Guinness World Records 2015,  page 152

Living people
Indian female mountain climbers
Indian mountain climbers
Indian summiters of Mount Everest
Indian twins
Sportspeople from Dehradun
1991 births
Sportswomen from Uttarakhand
Mountain climbers from Uttarakhand
21st-century Indian women
21st-century Indian people
Summiters of the Seven Summits
Nari Shakti Puraskar winners
Padma Shri Award
Recipients of the Tenzing Norgay National Adventure Award
Participants in American reality television series